Othellos Famagusta was a Cypriot football club based in Famagusta. The team playing sometimes in Second Division. It was dissolved in 1963.

References

Association football clubs disestablished in 1963
Defunct football clubs in Cyprus
1963 disestablishments in Cyprus